Avdiky is an old and uncommon Russian Christian male first name. Its colloquial variants are Adiky and Avda. It is possibly derived from the Latin word abdico, meaning to denounce, to relinquish, or to deny.

The diminutives of "Avdiky" are Avdya, Avdyusha, and Adya.

The patronymics derived from "Avdiky" are "" (Avdikiyevich) and "" (Avdikyevich; both masculine), and "" (Avdikiyevna) and "" (Avdikyevna; both feminine).

References

Notes

Sources
Н. А. Петровский (N. A. Petrovsky). "Словарь русских личных имён" (Dictionary of Russian First Names). ООО Издательство "АСТ". Москва, 2005. 
[1] А. В. Суперанская (A. V. Superanskaya). "Современный словарь личных имён: Сравнение. Происхождение. Написание" (Modern Dictionary of First Names: Comparison. Origins. Spelling). Айрис-пресс. Москва, 2005. 
[2] А. В. Суперанская (A. V. Superanskaya). "Словарь русских имён" (Dictionary of Russian Names). Издательство Эксмо. Москва, 2005.